Júlio Sarmento da Costa (born 20 July 1959), also known by his nom de guerre , is an East Timorese politician and a member of the Democratic Party (PD). He is the incumbent Minister for the Affairs of National Liberation Combatants, serving since May 2020 under the VIII Constitutional Government of East Timor led by Taur Matan Ruak. Previously, between August 2012 and February 2015, he was Secretary of State for the Combatants for National Liberation Affairs, and in 2017–2018 he was a Member of the National Parliament.

Political career
In the 2007 East Timorese parliamentary election, Costa was nominated in the unwinnable 22nd place on the PD list, and was not elected.

In the 2012 parliamentary election, Costa was in 13th place on the list and narrowly missed out on a Parliamentary seat, despite the waivers of some of those who had been higher in the list. In any case, he would have had to forego any such seat, as on 8 August 2012 he was sworn in as Secretary of State for the Combatants for National Liberation Affairs in the V Constitutional Government, headed by Xanana Gusmão. On 16 February 2015, his tenure in that position came to an end due to a government reshuffle.

In the 2017 parliamentary election, Costa was placed in 8th position on the PD list. Although the PD won only seven seats, one of its candidates, António da Conceição renounced his seat, and Costa succeeded him. On 6 September 2017, the second day of the ensuing Parliamentary session, Costa was elected a First Deputy Speaker of the Parliament. During that session, he was also a member of the Committee for Foreign Affairs, Defence and National Security (Committee B). In the 2018 parliamentary election, Costa was in list position 7, and again missed direct entry into Parliament, as the PD won only 5 seats.

On 29 May 2020, as part of a restructuring of the VIII Constitutional Government, Costa was sworn in as Minister for the Affairs of National Liberation Combatants in that government.

Honours
 , Timor-Leste (First Grade, for more than eight years' participation in the independence movement)

References

External links 

Democratic Party (East Timor) politicians
Government ministers of East Timor
Living people
Members of the National Parliament (East Timor)
1959 births
People from Ainaro District
21st-century East Timorese politicians